The History of Tenrikyo concerns the social and institutional development of Tenrikyo, from the day the teachings were founded by Miki Nakayama on October 26, 1838, to the present day.

Confraternities
Since the early 1860s, Miki Nakayama had asked her followers to form confraternities (ko 講). One of the earliest examples was the Shinmei confraternity, formed sometime in April 1878.

Obtaining government authorization
From the 1870s, Miki Nakayama and her followers were constantly being persecuted by local government authorities and from members of established religions for expressing their beliefs and performing the Service. To put an end to the persecution, various followers sought for recognition from different religious and state authorities, even though this was against the wishes of Nakayama. Tenrikyo could not apply as a completely independent religion because Japanese law during the Meiji period did not grant civil authorization to churches outside of the established traditions, which at the time were Shinto, Buddhism, and Christianity.

In 1880, Nakayama's eldest son, Shuji traveled to the Jifuku Temple at the foot of Mount Kongō, a Buddhist temple belonging to the Shingon sect. The Jifuku Temple agreed to Shuji's request to establish a church, and on September 22, 1880, the "Tenrin-O-Kosha" church was formally inaugurated with a Buddhist fire rite and sermons by Buddhist priests.

The Meisei confraternity spread Nakayama's teachings as moral philosophy and thus escaped persecution. Following this example, a petition was submitted on May 9, 1884, to establish an organization named, "Tenrin-O-Sha: Institute for the Study of Practical Ethics." Thought the office denied the request because of the lack authority to grant the request, an office called "Tenrin-O-Sha" was nevertheless opened in Osaka.

In March and April 1885, the followers approached the Shinto Headquarters for the appointment of Shinnosuke Nakayama (Nakayama's grandson) and nine others as religious instructors. On May 22, Shinnosuke was appointed as a religious instructor, and the next day, May 23, the other religious instructors were also appointed, and permission was granted for the establishment of a sixth-degree church to be directly supervised by the Shinto Headquarters. On June 2, a letter accepting these appointments was sent to the Shinto authorities.

The first attempt to obtain civil authorization happened on April 29, 1885, when the followers filed a petition to the governor of Osaka for permission to form the Tenrikyo Church. Attached with the petition were four texts – The Twelve Songs, Ofudesaki Part IV, Ofudesaki Part X, and the Story of Creation. The request was denied. On July 3, the followers filed a second petition to the governor of Osaka, which read, "Request to Establish the Shinto Tenrikyo Church." Again, the request was denied.

Death of Nakayama Miki

On February 18, 1887, the foundress of Tenrikyo, Nakayama Miki, died at around two o'clock in the afternoon, after a performance of the Service.

On February 25, 1887, a funeral for Nakayama Miki was conducted, with over 10,000 people in attendance. Initially, she was buried in the graveyard at Zenpuku-ji (a Buddhist temple in modern-day Tenri City), along with other members of the Nakayama family. However, in 1892, Tenrikyo followers, led by Nakayama Shinnosuke, constructed a new cemetery on Mount Toyoda, and the ceremony for her reburial was held on December 13. The reburial ceremony was attended by over a hundred thousand people.

Under Shinto Main Bureau
A petition for the legal recognition of a church was sent to the government office of Tokyo prefecture. On April 10, 1888, the governor of Tokyo approved this petition, establishing Tenrikyo Church Headquarters as a "sixth class" church belonging to the Shinto Main Bureau (神道本局 Shinto Honkyoku). The legal authorization removed the threat of suppression and allowed followers to seek permission to establish branch churches and to gain official recognition for missionary work. Later in 1888, Koriyama and Yamana were established as the first two branch churches under Tenrikyo Church Headquarters.

On April 6, 1891, the Shinto Main Bureau changed Tenrikyo's designation from a "sixth class" church to a "first class" church.

Rise in membership

The membership rose sharply in the first decade of the Headquarters' existence. In 1892, the number of Tenrikyo followers had allegedly reached over one million, a thirty-fold increase in membership in five years. By December 1896, Tenrikyo had 3,137,113 members belonging to 1,078 churches, and there were 19,061 ministers. This growth invited negative reactions from Buddhist institutions, which were concerned about losing adherents, and from newspapers such as Chuo Shinbun, Yorozu Chouho, and Ni-Roku Shinbun, who labeled the religion as "anti-social."

Home Ministry's directive
On April 6, 1896, the Home Ministry (内務省 Naimu-shō) issued "Directive No. 12," which ordered strict and secretive surveillance over Tenrikyo Church Headquarters under the pretense of maintaining and strengthening the state polity of Japan. Issues raised by authorities were the congregation of both men and women together (which could potentially lead to disgrace), the obstruction of medical treatment, and the alleged policy of enforced donations.

The Tenrikyo leaders complied to the state demands in several ways. They changed several aspects of their prayer ritual, known to adherents as the Service. The name of the Tenrikyo deity Tenri-O-no-Mikoto was changed to "Tenri-no-Okami." Tenrikyo Church Headquarters' conformity with the state demands resulted in a dual structure of the Tenrikyo faith, where on the surface, Tenrikyo complied with the state demands, while adherents disregarded those changes and maintained the teachings and rites as initially taught by Miki Nakayama.<ref>Tenrikyo: The Path to Joyousness, 61-63.</ref>

Drive toward sectarian independence
In 1899 the Shinto Main Bureau advised the Tenrikyo Church Headquarters officials about the possibility of official recognition as an independent religion (independent meaning to be classified directly under the Meiji government, which upheld State Shinto ideology). Tenrikyo leaders worked to systemize the Tenrikyo doctrine and institutionalize the organization so that the petition for independence would pass. Tenrikyo Church Headquarters made a total of five attempts before it finally achieved independence in 1908.

On April 1, 1900, Tenri Seminary, Tenrikyo's first educational institution, was founded as a training school for ministers. In 1902, Tenrikyo arranged its mission administration system in Japan, which divided the country into ten dioceses and appointed superintendents to supervise regional missionary activities.

In 1903, an edition of Tenrikyo's doctrine was compiled (known today as the Meiji kyoten, or the Meiji version of Tenrikyo's doctrine). This edition of the doctrine differs significantly from the present edition because the teachings of State Shinto were incorporated in order to gain the Home Ministry's approval. Although Tenrikyo Church Headquarters complied with many of the state's requests, it did not compromise on the request to eliminate the Mikagura-uta ("The Songs for the Service"), one of Tenrikyo's main scriptures.

Around this time, Tenrikyo began to open its first churches overseas in Taiwan (1897) and Korea (1904).

Sect Shinto
The fifth petition for independence was submitted to the Home Ministry on March 20, 1908, and accepted later that year in November 27. Tenrikyo Church Headquarters set up its Administrative Headquarters, formally appointed Shinnosuke Nakayama as the first shinbashira, the spiritual and administrative leader of Tenrikyo, and established its constitution. On February 25, 1912, the Home Ministry invited representatives from seventy-three religious groups to the Three Religions Conference (三教会同 Sankyokaido) including a Tenrikyo representative (the three religions represented were Shinto, Buddhism, and Christianity, and Tenrikyo was categorized under Shinto). This conference initiated a program of national edification, and with the support of the government, Tenrikyo was able to hold lectures at 2,074 places through Japan, drawing nearly a quarter million listeners. Due to the relative relaxation of state control on Tenrikyo rituals, the performance of section one of the Mikagura-uta was restored in 1916, after two decades of prohibition under the Home Ministry's directive.

In 1925, a school of foreign languages was established for missionaries, including what would become Tenri Central Library. The same year saw the establishment of a printing office, a department for researching of doctrinal and biographical materials, and a major expansion of the church's education system, including a new girls’ school, nursery, kindergarten, and elementary school.

In 1928, the Ofudesaki was published. Three years later, in 1931, the publication of the Osashizu was completed, making the three main scriptures of Tenrikyo available to all followers for the first time.

On the occasion of the completion of the South Worship Hall of the Main Sanctuary in 1934, the Kagura Service was restored for the first time since it had been prohibited in 1896.

During this period, churches were opened in Manchuria (1911), the U.S. (San Francisco Church, 1927), Brazil, and Southeast Asian countries. In 1910, missionaries were sent to England to propagate the Tenrikyo teachings, but they were not able to establish themselves permanently there. It was only a number of decades later, in 2000, that a mission center (Tenrikyo UK Centre) was established in England.

Wartime Japan
As the war between Japan and China grew from the Mukden Incident to the Second Sino-Japanese War, state control of religious and secular thought intensified. For example, in December 1935, state authorities destroyed the buildings of Omotokyo Headquarters and arrested the organization's leaders. One week later, on December 16, 1935, around four hundred policemen were sent to investigate Tenrikyo Church Headquarters on suspicion of tax evasion, even though there were no grounds for that accusation.

After the National Mobilization Law was passed in 1938, Japan's wartime polity strengthened. In 1939, Tenrikyo Church Headquarters announced that it would reform its doctrine and ritual, under threat of forced disbanding of the organization by state authorities. Under the reformation, copies of the Ofudesaki and Osashizu were recalled, certain chapters were deleted from the Mikagura-uta, and the Kagura Service, an important Tenrikyo ritual, was not allowed to be performed. All preaching, rites, and events were to follow the Meiji version of Tenrikyo's doctrine from 1903. The 1940 Religious Organizations Law further increased state surveillance and oppression in Japan.

After World War II

In its own historical account, Tenrikyo refers to the years following the surrender of Japan and the conclusion of World War II as fukugen, or "restoration." One of the significant aspects of the "restoration" was the republishing and reissuing of the three scriptures of Tenrikyo in their entirety: the Mikagura-uta in 1946, the Ofudesaki in 1948, and the Osashizu'' in 1949. In addition, the doctrine, which for decades had been colored by State Shinto ideology, was revised to reflect the teachings conveyed in the main scriptures and authorized in 1949.

Another aspect of the "restoration" was the construction of the Oyasato-yakata, begun in 1954. As of 1998, twenty four wings have been completed and are used for various purposes, such as educational facilities, medicinal facilities, institutes for doctrinal studies and religious training, and followers' dormitories. The construction continues to this day.

The "Tenrikyo-Christian Dialogue," a symposium cosponsored by Tenri University and Pontifical Gregorian University, was held in Rome, Italy from March 9–11, 1998. Three years later, the universities cosponsored another symposium, "Tenrikyo-Christian Dialogue II," held at Tenri, Japan from September 28–30, 2002.

Schisms and influences
Below is a list of Tenrikyo and the schisms or influences the institution has produced:
Tenrikyo
Daidokyo
Honmichi, founded by Ōnishi Aijirō (1881-1958)
Honbushin, founded by Ōnishi Tama (1916-1969)
Sekai Shindokyo, founded by Aida Hide (1898-1973)
Tenri Kami no Kuchiake Basho
Okanmichi
Tenri Sanrinko
Shuyodan Hoseikai, founded by Idei Seitarō (1899-1983)
Taidokyo
Hachirakukai Kyodan, founded by Ogawa Kōichirō (1919–80)

References

Further reading
 
 
 
 
 
 

Tenrikyo
Tenrikyo